Pee Froiss is a hip hop group formed in Dakar, Senegal in 1993. It was originally produced by another hip hop group from that city, Positive Black Soul, and since recorded with the duo. The band's music is rapped in Wolof, French, and English and features traditional Senegalese instruments such as the kora as part of its instrumentation. Pee Froiss was one of the first rap groups to include a female performer in their lineup, Sista Joyce. The group's members create all of their own music videos with very sparse resources, the first of which was released in 1996 with their first album.

Though the group released six successful cassette albums solely in Senegal and appeared on several European compilations, the group's first release to be sold internationally was 2003's Konkérants.

Discography
Wala Wala Bok (1996)
Affaire Bou Graw (1997)
Ah Simm (1999)
F.R.O.I.S.S (2001)
Konkérants (2003)

References

External links
Pee Froiss on Myspace

Senegalese hip hop groups
Musical groups established in 1993
1993 establishments in Senegal